Lougheed is an Irish variant of a surname of Scottish origins, meaning head of the lake. Lougheed or Loughead may refer to:

Places
 Lougheed, Alberta, a Canadian village
 Lougheed Island, Nunavut, Canada
 Lougheed Highway, part of British Columbia Highway 7
 The City of Lougheed, a shopping mall in Burnaby, British Columbia, Canada
 Mount Lougheed, Alberta, Canada

People
 Allan Lockheed (born Loughead), American co-founder of Lockheed Corporation and brother of Malcolm 
 Cook Lougheed, American entrepreneur and philanthropist
 Dave Lougheed, Canadian international rugby player
 James Alexander Lougheed, Canadian businessman and politician
 Lisa Lougheed, Canadian singer and voice actress
 Malcolm Loughead (born Loughead), American co-founder of Lockheed Corporation and brother of Allan
 Peter Lougheed, lawyer, Premier of Alberta, and Canadian Football League player

See also
 Lochhead, a surname
 Lockheed (disambiguation)

Gaelic-language surnames